France competed at the 1984 Summer Olympics in Los Angeles, United States. 238 competitors, 189 men and 49 women, took part in 139 events in 21 sports.

Medalists

Archery

After not competing in archery in 1980, France returned to the sport in 1984 with two male competitors.

Men's Individual Competition:
 Gerard Douis – 2485 points (→ 17th place)
 Philippe Loyen – 2411 points (→ 35th place)

Athletics

Men's Competition
Men's 400 metres 
 Aldo Canti
 Heat — 46.14
 Quarterfinals — 45.64
 Semifinals — 45.59 (→ did not advance)
 Yann Quentrec
 Heat — 46.94 (→ did not advance)
 Hector LLatser
 Heat — 47.30 (→ did not advance)

Men's Marathon
 Alain Lazare
 Final — 2:17:52 (→ 28th place)
 Jacky Boxberger
 Final — 2:22:00 (→ 42nd place)

Men's High Jump
 Franck Verzy
 Qualification — 2.15m (→ did not advance)

Men's Javelin Throw
 Jean-Paul Lakafia
 Qualification — 80.52m
 Final — 70.86m (→ 12th place)

Men's Pole Vault 
 Pierre Quinon
 Qualifying Round — 5.35m
 Final — 5.75m (→  Gold Medal)
 Thierry Vigneron
 Qualifying Round — 5.40m
 Final — 5.60m (→  Bronze Medal)
 Serge Ferreira
 Qualifying Round — 5.30m
 Final — no mark (→ no ranking)

Men's Hammer Throw 
 Walter Ciofani
 Qualification — 73.10m
 Final — 73.46m (→ 7th place)

Men's Decathlon 
 William Motti
 Final Result — 8266 points (→ 5th place)

Men's 20 km Walk
 Gérard Lelièvre
 Final — 1:27:50 (→ 15th place)
 Martial Fesselier
 Final — 1:29:46 (→ 20th place)
 Dominique Guebey
 Final — did not start (→ no ranking)

Men's 50 km Walk
 Dominique Guebey
 Final — 4:13:34 (→ 12th place)
 Gérard Lelièvre
 Final — DNF (→ no ranking)

Women's Competition
Women's 3.000 metres 
 Annette Sergent
 Heat — 9.15.82 (→ did not advance)

Women's High Jump 
 Maryse Ewanjé-Epée
 Qualification — 1.90m
 Final — 1.94m (→ 4th place)
 Brigitte Rougeron
 Qualification — 1.84m (→ did not advance, 20th place)

Women's Heptathlon
 Florence Picaut
 Final Result — 5914 points (→ 13th place)
 Chantal Beaugeant
 Final Result — did not finish (→ no ranking)

Basketball

Men's team competition
Preliminary round (group B)
Lost to Uruguay (87-91)
Lost to PR China (83-85)
Lost to Spain (82-97)
Lost to United States (62-120)
Lost to Canada (69-96)
Classification Matches
9th/12th place: Lost to Brazil (86-100)
11th/12th place: Defeated Egypt (102-78) → Eleventh place
Team roster
Grégor Beugnot
Jean Michel Senegal
Richard Dacoury
Jacques Monclar
Philippe Szanyiel
Stéphane Ostrowski
Jean-Luc Deganis
Hervé Dubuisson
Patrick Cham
Bangaly Kaba
Éric Beugnot
Georges Vestris

Boxing

Men's Bantamweight (– 54 kg)
Louis Gomis
 First Round — Bye
 Second Round — Defeated Stefan Gertel (West Germany), retired in the second round
 Third Round — Lost to Ndaba Dube (Zimbabwe), 0-5

Men's Middleweight (– 75 kg)
 Vincent Sarnelli
 First Round – Bye
 Second Round – Lost to Moses Mwaba (Zambia), after knock-out in first round

Canoeing

Cycling

Seventeen cyclists, thirteen men and four women, represented France in 1984. Fabrice Colas won a bronze medal in the 1000m time trial.

Men's individual road race
 Daniel Amardeilh
 Philippe Bouvatier
 Claude Carlin
 Denis Pelizzari

Team time trial
 Jean-François Bernard
 Philippe Bouvatier
 Thierry Marie
 Denis Pelizzari

Sprint
 Philippe Vernet
 Franck Dépine

1000m time trial
 Fabrice Colas

Individual pursuit
 Pascal Robert
 Éric Louvel

Team pursuit
 Didier Garcia
 Éric Louvel
 Pascal Potié
 Pascal Robert

Points race
 Didier Garcia
 Éric Louvel

Women's individual road race
 Jeannie Longo — 2:12:35 (→ 6th place)
 Cécile Odin — 2:13:28 (→ 11th place)
 Dominique Damiani — 2:13:28 (→ 14th place)
 Marielle Guichard

Diving

Equestrianism

Fencing

20 fencers, 15 men and 5 women, represented France in 1984.

Men's foil
 Frédéric Pietruszka
 Philippe Omnès
 Pascal Jolyot

Men's team foil
 Frédéric Pietruszka, Pascal Jolyot, Patrick Groc, Philippe Omnès, Marc Cerboni

Men's épée
 Philippe Boisse
 Philippe Riboud
 Olivier Lenglet

Men's team épée
 Philippe Boisse, Jean-Michel Henry, Olivier Lenglet, Philippe Riboud, Michel Salesse

Men's sabre
 Jean-François Lamour
 Hervé Granger-Veyron
 Pierre Guichot

Men's team sabre
 Jean-François Lamour, Pierre Guichot, Hervé Granger-Veyron, Philippe Delrieu, Franck Ducheix

Women's foil
 Véronique Brouquier
 Laurence Modaine-Cessac
 Brigitte Latrille-Gaudin

Women's team foil
 Laurence Modaine-Cessac, Pascale Trinquet-Hachin, Brigitte Latrille-Gaudin, Véronique Brouquier, Anne Meygret

Football

Men's team competition
 Preliminary round (group A)
 France – Qatar 2-2
 France – Norway 2-1
 France – Chile 1-1
Quarterfinal
 France – Egypt 2-0
Semifinal
 France – Yugoslavia 4-2 [After extra time]
Final
 France – Brazil 2-0
Team roster
 ( 1.) Albert Rust
 ( 2.) William Ayache
 ( 3.) Michel Bibard
 ( 4.) Dominique Bijotat
 ( 5.) François Brisson
 ( 6.) Patrick Cubaynes
 ( 7.) Patrice Garande
 ( 8.) Philippe Jeannol
 ( 9.) Guy Lacombe
 (10.) Jean-Claude Lemoult
 (11.) Jean-Philippe Rohr
 (12.) Didier Sénac
 (13.) Jean-Christophe Thouvenel
 (14.) José Touré
 (15.) Daniel Xuereb
 (16.) Jean-Louis Zanon
 (17.) Michel Bensoussan
Head coach: Henri Michel

Gymnastics

Judo

Modern pentathlon

Three male pentathletes represented France in 1984. They won bronze in the team event.

Individual
 Paul Four
 Didier Boubé
 Joël Bouzou

Team
 Paul Four
 Didier Boubé
 Joël Bouzou

Rhythmic gymnastics

Rowing

Sailing

Shooting

Swimming

Men's 100m Freestyle 
Stéphan Caron
 Heat — 51.13
 Final — 50.70 (→ 6th place)

Men's 400m Freestyle 
Franck Iacono
 Heat — 3:55.07
 Final — 3:54.58 (→ 5th place)

Men's 1500m Freestyle 
Franck Iacono
 Heat — 15:27.27
 Final — 15:26.96 (→ 5th place)

Men's 100m Backstroke 
Frédéric Delcourt
 Heat — 58.22
 B-Final — DSQ (→ no ranking)

Men's 200m Backstroke 
Frédéric Delcourt
 Heat — 2:02.59
 Final — 2:01.75 (→  Silver Medal)

Men's 200m Breaststroke
Thierry Pata
 Heat — 2:20.14
 B-Final — 2:20.05 (→ 10th place)
Christophe Deneuville
 Heat — 2:24.54 (→ did not advance, 21st place)

Men's 4 × 100 m Freestyle Relay 
Stéphan Caron, Laurent Neuville, Dominique Bataille, and Bruno Lesaffre
 Heat — 3:24.68
 Final — 3:24.63 (→ 6th place)

Men's 4 × 200 m Freestyle Relay 
Pierre Andraca, Dominique Bataille, Michel Pou, and Stéphan Caron
 Heat — 7:27.40
Stéphan Caron, Dominique Bataille, Michel Pou, and Pierre Andraca
 Final — 7:30.16 (→ 8th place)

Men's 4 × 100 m Medley Relay
Frédéric Delcourt, Thierry Pata, Xavier Savin, and Stéphan Caron
 Heat — 3:50.75 (→ did not advance, 10th place)

Women's 100m Freestyle 
Sophie Kamoun
 Heat — 57.49
 B-Final — 57.81 (→ 13th place)

Women's 200m Freestyle
Laurence Bensimon
 Heat — 2:06.01 (→ did not advance, 19th place)

Women's 800m Freestyle 
Laurence Bensimon
 Heat — 9:01.75 (→ did not advance, 15th place)

Women's 200m Individual Medley
Laurence Bensimon
 Heat — 2:24.34
 B-Final — 2:27.13 (→ 16th place)

Women's 4 × 100 m Freestyle Relay 
Sophie Kamoun, Caroline Amoric, Laurence Bensimon, and Veronique Jardin
 Heat — 3:52.67
 Final — 3:52.15 (→ 8th place)

Synchronized swimming

Weightlifting

Wrestling

References

Nations at the 1984 Summer Olympics
1984
Summer Olympics